Czech Republic–Philippines relations refer to foreign relations between the Czech Republic and the Philippines. The Czech Republic has an embassy in Manila and the Philippines has an embassy in Prague.

Relations
The Philippines has signed the Agreement on Cooperation in the Fields of Culture, Education, Science and Sports in 2013. The Czech Republic had a profound impact on Filipinos as the Philippine National Hero Jose Rizal had a deep friendship with the Austrian-Czech anthropologist Ferdinand Blumentritt. Deputy Prime Minister Schwarzenberg visited Manila as both countries prepare to commemorate the 40th anniversary of their formal bilateral relations in 2013.

The Department of National Defense signed the establishment of Joint Defense Commission with the Czech Republic on May 26, 2014.

Economic relations
The Czech Republic is the Philippines 24th largest export market and the 8th biggest in Europeth bilateral trade amounting to $300 million from January to November in the year 2011.

See also
Foreign relations of the Czech Republic
Foreign relations of the Philippines
Philippines–European Union relations
ASEAN–European Union relations

References

Further reading
Shoiw-Mei Tseng. Trade Flows between Czech Republic and East Asia (PFD full text). January 2013.

 
Philippines
Bilateral relations of the Philippines